Niels Dorph (1681–1758) was a Danish/Norwegian clergyman. He served as Bishop of the Diocese of Oslo from 1738 to 1758.

References

1681 births
1758 deaths
Bishops of Oslo
18th-century Norwegian clergy